Jim McDermott (June 24, 1960 in Lowell, Massachusetts) is a New Hampshire-based artist who has illustrated for animation, magazines and comic books.

After graduating in 1982 from Boston's New England School of Art and Design (now part of Suffolk University), McDermott headed west, where he held a position as the staff illustrator for a publishing firm before entering the animation industry. For Columbia Pictures Television/DiC Entertainment's animated The Real Ghostbusters (1986–91), McDermott created concept drawings and designed characters, props and backgrounds. Leaving California after a decade, he did freelance work in Texas before returning to New England in 1993.

When the rates of famed caricaturist Bruce Stark became so high that Salem Sportswear (Hudson, New Hampshire) could no longer afford his illustrations for T-shirt designs, the company hired McDermott as a replacement, viewing him as the only illustrator capable of doing artwork similar to Stark and Jack Davis.

Promotional posters
For Gregg Press McDermott created a Western saloon poster to promote the books of Louis L'Amour and Max Brand, followed by a science fiction montage to sell Frank Herbert and Robert A. Heinlein.

Magazines and comic books
His work for comic books has appeared in GrimJack, Omega Men and Heavy Metal. Video Games & Computer Entertainment and TurboPlay featured his cover paintings and interior illustrations of video game characters.

Books with his illustrations include The Stephen King Encyclopedia. His client list also includes Apple Computer, Blackthorne Publishing, Eternity Comics, Fidelity Investments, Fizz, Fruit of the Loom, IBM, Little Golden Books and Wang Laboratories.

Current work
He became a member of the Seacoast Art Association in 1997. Currently, he posts recent work on his blog, Sketches and Scribbles. In recent years, he has produced numerous portraits of 20th-century personalities, including Lon Chaney, Sr., Elaine Dundy. Marilyn Manson and O. O. McIntyre. Many of his portraits are posted on an earlier blog, Denizens of the Darkness.

In 2008, he began doing a series of covers for Vincent Price Presents and other comic books published by Bluewater Productions. For Bluewater's biographical comic book series, he painted covers of Rush Limbaugh and Nancy Pelosi.

See also
List of illustrators

External links
Sketches and Scribbles: Jim McDermott
Denizens of the Darkness
Illustrations by Jim McDermott
MySpace: Jim McDermott
TurboPlay magazine archives

1960 births
American caricaturists
American cartoonists
American comics artists
20th-century American painters
American male painters
21st-century American painters
Comics inkers
Living people
Artists from Lowell, Massachusetts
Artists from New Hampshire
Suffolk University alumni
20th-century American male artists